Antonio Almada (26 April 1931 – November 2018) was a Mexican modern pentathlete and fencer. He competed in the modern pentathlon at the 1952, 1956 and 1960 Summer Olympics. He also competed in the épée fencing events at the 1960 Games.

References

External links
 

1931 births
2018 deaths
Mexican male épée fencers
Mexican male modern pentathletes
Olympic fencers of Mexico
Olympic modern pentathletes of Mexico
Modern pentathletes at the 1952 Summer Olympics
Modern pentathletes at the 1956 Summer Olympics
Modern pentathletes at the 1960 Summer Olympics
Fencers at the 1960 Summer Olympics
People from Navojoa
Sportspeople from Sonora
Pan American Games gold medalists for Mexico
Pan American Games bronze medalists for Mexico
Pan American Games medalists in modern pentathlon
Modern pentathletes at the 1955 Pan American Games
Competitors at the 1959 Pan American Games
Modern pentathletes at the 1963 Pan American Games
Medalists at the 1955 Pan American Games
Medalists at the 1959 Pan American Games
Medalists at the 1963 Pan American Games
20th-century Mexican people